Pedro Alcides Sarabia Achucarro (born 5 July 1975) is a Paraguayan football manager and former player who played as a defender. He is the current manager of Nacional Asunción.

Career
Sarabia made his debut for the Paraguay national team in 1995, and has got 47 caps. He represented Paraguay at the World Cups in 1998 and 2002.

Sarabia retired from active professional football on 7 July 2012 playing for Libertad against Rubio Ñú (1-0) in the last game of the Apertura 2012 tournament. He was substituted on the 26th minute of the second half.

References

External links

Career history at Weltfussball.de 
Career history at ABC Color

1975 births
Living people
Sportspeople from Asunción
Paraguayan footballers
Paraguay international footballers
1998 FIFA World Cup players
2002 FIFA World Cup players
Club Atlético Banfield footballers
Club Atlético River Plate footballers
Paraguayan Primera División players
Argentine Primera División players
Paraguayan expatriate footballers
Expatriate footballers in Argentina
Expatriate footballers in Mexico
Club Libertad footballers
Chiapas F.C. footballers
1995 Copa América players
1997 Copa América players
Association football defenders
Paraguayan football managers
Club Libertad managers
Club Nacional managers
12 de Octubre Football Club managers
Sportivo Luqueño managers
Deportivo Santaní managers